Anthony Weekes (died 1573) was an English politician.

He was a Member (MP) of the Parliament of England for Salisbury in 1563. In 1565, he was mayor of Salisbury.

References

Year of birth missing
1573 deaths
English MPs 1563–1567
Mayors of Salisbury